Rocky River may refer to:

Localities 
Rocky River, Ohio, USA
 Rocky River, New South Wales near Uralla, Australia

Electorates 
Electoral district of Rocky River (South Australia)

Streams 

In Australia:
 Rocky River (New South Wales)  
 Rocky River (Queensland)
 Rocky River (Kangaroo Island) on Kangaroo Island in South Australia
 Rocky River (South Australia) in the Mid North of South Australia
 Rocky River (Victoria)

In Canada:
 Rocky River (Newfoundland) in Newfoundland-Labrador

In New Zealand:
 Rocky River (New Zealand) in the South Island

In the United States:
 Rocky River (Alaska)
 Rocky River (Connecticut)
 Rocky River (Michigan)
 Rocky River (North Carolina)
 Rocky River (Deep River tributary), a stream in North Carolina
 Rocky River (Ohio)
 Rocky River (South Carolina)
 Rocky River (Tennessee), a tributary of Caney Fork River